SIMC may refer to:

 Singapore International Mediation Centre
 , a Polish government identifier for places.
 Sendai International Music Competition